Cloud-Paradise is a 1990 Russian comedy film directed by Nikolai Dostal. It was voted best film of 1992 by 90 Russian critics.

Plot 

In a small provincial town, early in the morning, Kolya encounters his friend Fedya, wearily and indifferently. Wanting to attract attention, Kolya says that he is going to leave, ostensibly, to the Far East. His decision wins unanimous support. Kolya becomes a local hero, all the neighbors assist in his training. Kolya sells his furniture off, writes a resignation letter and leaves his hometown on a bus. He is on his way to nowhere.

Cast 
 Andrei Zhigalov - Kolya
 Sergey Batalov - Fedya
 Irina Rozanova - Valya, Fedya's wife
 Alla Kliouka - Natalia
 Anna Ovsyannikova - Tatiana Ivanovna, Natalia's mother
 Vladimir Tolokonnikov - Felomeev
 Lev Borisov - Philipp Makarovich, neighbor
 Aleksandr Chislov - mate of Felomeev

Awards and nominations
 Prize For the destruction of a barrier between your favorite movies and cinema for all at the first festival Kinotavr in 1991.
 Golden Aries Award in 1992
 Silver Leopard Special Grand Jury Prize and Second Prize and youth jury prize of the International Confederation of experimental film in the Locarno International Film Festival in 1991
 Grand Prix II MFEC (France)
 Special Jury Prize cast of young actors in the 1991 Geneva Film Festival

References

External links 

1990 comedy films
1990 films
Soviet comedy films
Russian comedy films